During the Tunku Abdul Rahman's term as Prime Minister of Malaysia, the Parliamentary Secretaries was appointed to assist the full Ministers in select areas of their Ministries but are not members of the cabinet. Their duty was to answer questions and table reports on behalf of ministers when they were unable to be present in the house. The tradition of the Prime Minister to appoint the Parliamentary Secretary was continued until the position was removed in the Third Abdullah cabinet after the 2008 Malaysian general election. The partial live telecasts of Parliament proceedings began in 2008 to allow the public to watch the Ministers or Deputy Ministers personally answering questions during Question Time in Parliament.

Second Abdullah cabinet

Original composition

Composition before cabinet dissolution

First Abdullah cabinet

Original composition

Composition before cabinet dissolution

Sixth Mahathir cabinet

Original composition

Composition before cabinet dissolution

Fifth Mahathir cabinet

Original composition

Composition before cabinet dissolution

Fourth Mahathir cabinet

Original composition

Composition before cabinet dissolution

Third Mahathir cabinet

Original composition

Composition before cabinet dissolution

Second Mahathir cabinet

Original composition

Composition before cabinet dissolution

First Mahathir cabinet

Original composition

Composition before cabinet dissolution

Second Hussein cabinet

Original composition

Composition before cabinet dissolution

First Hussein cabinet

Original composition

Composition before cabinet dissolution

Second Razak cabinet

Original composition

Composition before cabinet dissolution

First Razak cabinet

Original composition

Composition before cabinet dissolution

Third Rahman cabinet

Composition before cabinet dissolution

See also
List of members of the Dewan Rakyat